Ribosome biogenesis regulatory protein homolog is a protein that in humans is encoded by the RRS1 gene.

References

Further reading